Sehili is a census-designated place (CDP) in Apache County, Arizona, United States.  The population was 135 at the 2010 census.

Geography
Sehili is located at  (36.2797, −109.1679), directly east of the Tsaile CDP.

Education
The census-designated place is within the Chinle Unified School District, which operates Chinle High School.

Demographics

References

Census-designated places in Apache County, Arizona
Populated places on the Navajo Nation